Saint-Savin, also referred to as Saint-Savin-sur-Gartempe (literally Saint-Savin on Gartempe), is a commune in the Vienne department in the Nouvelle-Aquitaine region in western France. It is located on the banks of the Gartempe.

Abbey Church

The Romanesque Abbey Church, begun in the mid 11th century, contains many beautiful 11th- and 12th-century murals which are still in a remarkable state of preservation. It has been a UNESCO World Heritage Site since 1983.

Demographics

See also
Communes of the Vienne department

References

External links
 Saint-Savin-sur-Gartempe 

Communes of Vienne